Front for Workers' Unity (FUT) was a Spanish party alliance formed to contest the 1977 general election by the Revolutionary Communist League (LCR), Communist Action (AC), Organization of Communist Left (OIC) and Workers' Party of Marxist Unification (POUM).

Member parties
Revolutionary Communist League (LCR)
Communist Action (AC)
Organization of Communist Left (OIC)
Workers' Party of Marxist Unification (POUM)

References

Defunct political party alliances in Spain
Communist parties in Spain